A continent is a large landmass. 

The Continent is used by those on the periphery of Europe to refer the mainland.

Continent or the continent may also refer to:

Entertainment and media
Continent (The Acacia Strain album), 2008
Continent (CFCF album)
Continents, 2013 album by The Eclectic Moniker
Continent (journal), open-access journal founded in 2010
The Continent (film), a 2014 Chinese film
The Continent (newspaper), a digital newspaper covering Africa

Science and healthcare
 Continent, in geology a synonym for Continental crust

Other uses
Continent (airline), Russian airline
Continent (horse), British racehorse

See also
Continence (disambiguation)
Continents of the world (template)
Continental (disambiguation)
Continente